Tilak Maidan is a multi-use stadium located in Vasco da Gama, Goa, India. It is used mostly for football matches and regularly hosts matches in the I-League as well as Goa Professional League. It also hosted Indian Super League matches from 2020 till 2022 due to covid where the whole season was held in 3 venues in Goa and this stadium was one of them. The Goal end's on this Ground are referred to as the Harbour End & the City End.

Overview
The venue has the capacity to
accommodate 5,000 spectators. The Group stage of the football event during 2014 Lusofonia Games was held here. The stadium is maintained by the Sports Authority of Goa.
It has been upgraded
satisfactorily to ensure most FIFA standards are
maintained. Facilities include player changing rooms and
lounge, dope control rooms and a media centre.
The Stadium is used by Churchill Brothers S.C., Dempo S.C., Salgaocar S.C., Sporting Clube de Goa and Vasco S.C. and Indian Arrows. The stadium was serving as one of the venues of the Indian Super League due to the Covid 19 pandemic in India.

References 

Football venues in Goa
Sports venues in Goa
Vasco SC
Buildings and structures in Vasco da Gama, Goa
Memorials to Bal Gangadhar Tilak
Year of establishment missing